The All-Africa Games is a multi-sport event which began in 1965. Athletics has been one of the sports held at the Games since the inaugural edition. Records set by athletes who are representing one of the Association of National Olympic Committees of Africa's member states.

Men's records

Women's records

References

External links
All-Africa Games results on GBRAthletics.com

Records
African Games
Athletics
African Games